Giorgi Nadiradze (born 25 September 1987, Tbilisi) is a Georgian road bicycle racer. He competed at the 2012 Summer Olympics in the Men's road race, but failed to finish.

References

External links

Male cyclists from Georgia (country)
1987 births
Living people
Olympic cyclists of Georgia (country)
Cyclists at the 2012 Summer Olympics
Sportspeople from Tbilisi